"I'm a Flirt" is a song by American rapper Bow Wow featuring American singer R. Kelly. The song was scheduled to be the second single released from Bow Wow's fifth album The Price of Fame but the decision was changed to "Outta My System". Instead, it appears as a bonus track on the album. The remix of "I'm a Flirt" became the first single from R. Kelly's album Double Up and peaked at #12 on the Billboard Hot 100. 
This video was premiered on BET'S Access Granted on March 7, 2007.

Music video
The music video is directed by Benny Boom.

Unique chart methodology
For the song's chart run in the United States, Billboard magazine listed both versions of the song at one position on its music charts, even though R. Kelly's version received more radio play and downloads.  This was explained in Michael Paoletta's "Inside Track" column in the March 3, 2007, print edition of the magazine:

Charts and certifications

Weekly charts

Year-end charts

Certifications

References

2006 songs
2007 singles
Bow Wow (rapper) songs
R. Kelly songs
T.I. songs
T-Pain songs
Music videos directed by Benny Boom
Song recordings produced by R. Kelly
Songs written by R. Kelly
Songs written by Bow Wow (rapper)
Songs written by T-Pain
Songs written by T.I.
Songs written by Lil' Ronnie